Pavlos Valdaseridis was a poet, prose writer, translator and playwright. He was born in Larnaca, Cyprus in 1892 and lived many years in France. His poetry is lyrical, with intense religious elements and a philosophical mood. Valdaseridis died in 1972.

Poetry
 Love for Beauty, Larnaca, Cyprus, 1921
 May Herbs (Mayovotana), Larnaca, Cyprus, 1938
 Hermes, Larnaca, 1947
 Cyprus, Athens, 1972
 Here the good Shepard (Ide o Kalos Poimin), ?

Prose
 A look on life (Mia matia sti zoi), 1924
 The immortals (Oi athanatoi), 1943

Bibliography
 Kipriaki Vivliographia, Larnaca, Kyriazi N.G. 1935, page 188
 Pavlos Valdaseridis, Pneumatiki Kypros, Pyth, Drosioti, pages 251-252

References

20th-century poets
1892 births
1972 deaths
Cypriot expatriates in France
Cypriot poets
People from Larnaca